In number theory, Dixon's factorization method (also Dixon's random squares method or Dixon's algorithm) is a general-purpose integer factorization algorithm; it is the prototypical factor base method. Unlike for other factor base methods, its run-time bound comes with a rigorous proof that does not rely on conjectures about the smoothness properties of the values taken by polynomial.

The algorithm was designed by John D. Dixon, a mathematician at Carleton University, and was published in 1981.

Basic idea
Dixon's method is based on finding a congruence of squares modulo the integer N which is intended to factor. Fermat's factorization method finds such a congruence by selecting random or pseudo-random x values and hoping that the integer x2 mod N is a perfect square (in the integers):

So .

In practice, selecting random x values will take an impractically long time to find a congruence of squares, since there are only  squares less than N.

Dixon's method replaces the condition "is the square of an integer" with the much weaker one "has only small prime factors"; for example, there are 292 squares smaller than 84923; 662 numbers smaller than 84923 whose prime factors are only 2,3,5 or 7; and 4767 whose prime factors are all less than 30. (Such numbers are called B-smooth with respect to some bound B.)

Method
Suppose the composite number N is being factored. Bound B is chosen, and the factor base is identified (which is called P), the set of all primes less than or equal to B. Next, positive integers z are sought such that z2 mod N is B-smooth. Therefore it can be written, for suitable exponents ai,

 

When enough of these relations have been generated (it is generally sufficient that the number of relations be a few more than the size of P), the methods of linear algebra can be used (for example, Gaussian elimination) to multiply together these various relations in such a way that the exponents of the primes on the right-hand side are all even:

 

This yields a congruence of squares of the form  which can be turned into a factorization of N,  This factorization might turn out to be trivial (i.e. ), which can only happen if  in which case another try has to be made with a different combination of relations; but a nontrivial pair of factors of N can be reached, and the algorithm will terminate.

Pseudocode 

 input: positive integer 
 output: non-trivial factor of 
 
 Choose bound 
 Let  be all primes 
 
 repeat
         Choose  such that  is -smooth
         Let  such that 
     end for
 
     Find non-empty  such that 
     Let 
         
 while  
 
 return

Example
This example will try to factor N = 84923 using bound B = 7. The factor base is then P = {2, 3, 5, 7}. Suppose that two of the numbers found are 513 and 537:

 

 

So

 

Then

That is, 

The resulting factorization is 84923 = gcd(20712 − 16800, 84923) × gcd(20712 + 16800, 84923) = 163 × 521.

Optimizations
The quadratic sieve is an optimization of Dixon's method. It selects values of x close to the square root of  such that x2 modulo N is small, thereby largely increasing the chance of obtaining a smooth number.

Other ways to optimize Dixon's method include using a better algorithm to solve the matrix equation, taking advantage of the sparsity of the matrix: a number z cannot have more than  factors, so each row of the matrix is almost all zeros.  In practice, the block Lanczos algorithm is often used. Also, the size of the factor base must be chosen carefully: if it is too small, it will be difficult to find numbers that factorize completely over it, and if it is too large, more relations will have to be collected.

The optimal complexity of Dixon's method is 

in big-O notation, or

in L-notation.

References

Integer factorization algorithms
Squares in number theory